More Monsters and Sprites is the third EP and first remix album by American electronic music producer Skrillex. It was released exclusively on Beatport on June 7, 2011 through Big Beat Records and mau5trap Recordings, while being released on other online retailers on June 21, 2011. It is a follow-up to his previous EP, Scary Monsters and Nice Sprites, containing four additional remixes of the title track done by Dirtyphonics, Phonat, The Juggernauts and Kaskade, as well as three original tracks. The iTunes version also includes a music video of "Rock n' Roll (Will Take You to the Mountain)". Musically, More Monsters and Sprites uses prominent elements of dubstep, while also featuring technical breakdowns and influences of reggae within the first track.

The EP reached number 124 on the Billboard 200, as well as the top five on the Billboard Heatseekers and Dance/Electronica Albums chart. It also reached number 60 on the ARIA Charts in Australia. Its lead single, "First of the Year (Equinox)", has since become the EP's most commercially successful single, peaking within the charts of the United States, Australia, Canada, Norway and Sweden. A music video for the song was directed by Tony Truand and was nominated at the 54th Grammy Awards for Best Short Form Music Video. The second single, "Ruffneck (Full Flex)", reached number 89 on the UK Singles Chart in the United Kingdom. A Christmas-themed music video directed by Tony Truand premiered for the song on December 23, 2011.

The project was originally intended to be an LP, but due to Skrillex’s apartment being robbed not long before completion, it was made an 
EP.

A vinyl version of this album was released on November 23, 2012 with a very different track listing, forgoing most of the remix tracks for the 3 unique tracks from the album, followed by the 2010 single "WEEKENDS!!!" and a remix by Zedd.

Track listing

Release history

Charts

References 

 SKRILLEX - MORE MONSTERS & SPRITES PREVIEW
 MORE MONSTERS & SPRITES PREVIEW - Skrillex.com
 Skrillex - Scary Monsters and Nice Sprites (Dirtyphonics Remix)

2010 EPs
Skrillex albums